The canton of Limay is an administrative division of the Yvelines department, northern France. Its borders were modified at the French canton reorganisation which came into effect in March 2015. Its seat is in Limay.

It consists of the following communes:
 
Brueil-en-Vexin
Drocourt
Épône
La Falaise
Follainville-Dennemont
Fontenay-Saint-Père
Gargenville
Guernes
Guitrancourt
Issou
Jambville
Juziers
Lainville-en-Vexin
Limay
Mézières-sur-Seine
Montalet-le-Bois
Oinville-sur-Montcient
Porcheville
Sailly
Saint-Martin-la-Garenne

References

Cantons of Yvelines